Mumar may refer to:

Lauro Mumar (1924–1990), Filipino basketball player
A rabbinical term for apostasy in Judaism